Willyama may refer to:
Electoral district of Willyama, New South Wales, Australia
former name of Broken Hill, New South Wales